Electoral reform in New York refers to efforts to change the voting and election laws in New York State.  In 2021, the New York State Legislature asked members of New York state through means of ballot proposals, all of which were denied by voters.

Alternate voting systems
In 1936, voters in New York City adopted the single transferable vote method of proportional representation. In the election immediately preceding STV's adoption, the Democrats won 95.3% of the seats on the Board of Aldermen with only 66.5% of the vote. In 1941, proportional representation gave the Democrats 65.5% of the seats on 64% of the vote, with the Republicans and three smaller parties also gaining seats in proportion to their voting strength. The system has since been repealed. However, the Conservative Party and Liberal Party continue to participate in the electoral system through electoral fusion.

Expansion of the electorate
New York disenfranchises felons both while they are in prison and while they are on parole. The Sentencing Project favors restoring these rights. New York allows absentee ballots for "registered voters who cannot make it to the polls on Election Day because of occupation, business, studies, travel, imprisonment (other than a convicted felon), illness, disability and hospitalization or resident in a long term care facility".

Allocation of electoral votes
In both 2006 and 2007, bills were introduced in the New York Legislature to join the National Popular Vote Interstate Compact and award the state's 31 electoral votes to the winner of the nationwide popular vote. Both proposals failed. The legislation later succeeded in 2014 when New York joined the compact.

Ballot access

A new party or independent candidate may gain ballot access for one election by collecting a set number of petition signatures for each office (or 5 percent of the votes cast for governor in the most recent election in the jurisdiction, if that is lower). A new party that wins 130,000 votes or 2% of the vote in the previous gubernatorial election or presidential election is recognized statewide as a political party and qualifies to participate in primary elections for two years. This total can be and often is obtained through electoral fusion. Candidates may gain access to primary election ballots by being "designated" by a relevant committee of the party or collecting signatures equal to 5 percent of the party's enrollment in the jurisdiction, up to a set number for each office. A candidate seeking the nomination of a party to which she or he does not belong – e.g. for purposes of fusion – must be authorized by a relevant committee of the party. Reformers would like to see the ballot access laws loosened.

2021 ballot proposals 

During the 2021 New York state elections, several ballot proposals were provided.  Ballot proposals #1 ("Making Various Changes to Redistricting Process"), #3 ("Allow Legislature to Pass Some-Day Voter Registration"), and #4 ("Allow Legislature to Pass No-Excuse Absentee Voting"), were all related to electoral reform.  In accordance with the New York State Constitution, a referendum must be given before the New York State Assembly moved for reforms.  All the above proposals were rejected by voters.  The results were as follows:

See also
 Electoral reform in the United States

References

External links
Fairvote New York.

New York
Politics of New York (state)